Cyrtodactylus dati  is a species of gecko that is endemic to Vietnam.

References

Cyrtodactylus
Reptiles described in 2003